Colin Wayne Dunsford  is a retired Australian accountant and company director. He was a partner at Ernst & Young until 2010 and continues there as a member of the firm's advisory board. He is a Fellow of the Institute of Chartered Accountants in Australia and holds a Bachelor of Economics. In 2013, he became a Member of the Order of Australia "for significant service to the community of South Australia, and to the accounting profession". In 2016, he was one of a group of prominent South Australians who signed an open letter encouraging government to continue to explore opportunities in the importation and storage of spent nuclear fuel, following the findings of the 2015-16 Nuclear Fuel Cycle Royal Commission.

Current board memberships 
 Chairman of Independent Gaming Corporation
 Chairman of Leaders Institute of South Australia
 Chairman of Adelaide Symphony Orchestra
 Chairman, SA Health Risk Management & Audit Committee
 Chairman, Department of State Development Audit and Risk Committee
 Chairman of Aboriginal Foundation of South Australia
 Board Member of Peter Couche Foundation
 Member, University of Adelaide Finance Committee

Past memberships 
 Chairman of Bedford Group
 Chairman, DFEEST Audit & Risk Management Committee
 Chair of Audit Committee, Centrex Metals 
 Deputy Chairman of Adelaide Festival of Arts
 Chairman of the Adelaide Convention Centre
 Chairman of the State Opera of South Australia

Personal life 
He lives in Leabrook, South Australia.

References 

Living people
Australian accountants
Members of the Order of Australia
Businesspeople from Adelaide
Ernst & Young people
Australian chairpersons of corporations
Year of birth missing (living people)